The Best of Ritchie Valens is a greatest hits package by Ritchie Valens.  

In 1981, Rhino Records began issuing a number of compilations from Bob Keane's Del-Fi Records catalog.  This compilation was a follow-up to the first release History of Ritchie Valens, a deluxe box set of Valens' original three Del-Fi albums. 

Six years later, with the success of the Ritchie Valens bio movie La Bamba, along with Los Lobos' chart-topping version of the movie title track, the soundtrack album (which also peaked at #1), and even Los Lobos' version of "Come On, Let's Go" (charting higher than the original), a new generation of Ritchie Valens fans surged all over the nation, wanting to experience the music as presented by Valens himself.  Rhino responded by reissuing The Best of Ritchie Valens as part of the label's Golden Archive Series compilations.  The success of the LP brought Valens back to the album charts after a 27-year absence, peaking at #100. Rhino then reissued Valens' original three Del-Fi albums, which sold well but did not chart.

Track listing

Side 1
"La Bamba"
"Bluebirds Over the Mountain"
"In a Turkish Town"
"Ooh My Head"
"Paddiwack Song"
"Stay Beside Me"
"Malaguena"

Side 2
"Come On, Let's Go"
"Donna"
"Fast Freight"
"We Belong Together"
"That's My Little Suzie"
"Hurry Up"
"Little Girl"

External links

Ritchie Valens compilation albums
1981 greatest hits albums